Salin is the surname of the following people:

Ari Salin (born 1947), Finnish hurdler and sprinter
Bernhard Salin (1861–1931), Swedish archaeologist, cultural historian and museum curator
Edgar Salin (1892–1974), German economist
Holger Salin (1911 –  1943/1944), Finnish footballer 
Kari Salin (born 1967), better known as Kari Wührer, American actress and singer
Pascal Salin (born 1939), French economist, university professor
Phil Salin (1950–1991), American economist and futurist
Riitta Salin (born 1950), Finnish sprinter 
Romain Salin (born 1984), French football (soccer) player
Sasu Salin (born 1991), Finnish basketball player